Simoneau is a surname. Notable people with the surname include:

Dan Simoneau, American cross-country skier
Mark Simoneau, linebacker
Léopold Simoneau, tenor
Yves Simoneau, film and TV director
Wayne Simoneau (1935-2017), American politician
Jacqueline Simoneau, Canadian Olympian Synchronized Swimmer